"Ordinary Love" is a song by Irish rock band U2. It was written to honour Nelson Mandela and is included in the biography film Mandela: Long Walk to Freedom. The song received a limited 10-inch vinyl release on Record Store Day on 29 November 2013, less than a week before Mandela died.

"Ordinary Love" peaked at number one on the Top Digital Download chart in Italy, where it was certified platinum by the Federation of the Italian Music Industry. U2 won the 2014 Golden Globe Award for Best Original Song, and in January 2014 the song was nominated for the Academy Award for Best Original Song, but it lost to "Let It Go" from Frozen.

An alternate version of the song, titled the "Extraordinary Mix", was included on deluxe edition of the band's 2017 studio album, Songs of Experience.

Writing and recording
U2 had been friends with Nelson Mandela for several years, having played concerts in South Africa. When movie producer Harvey Weinstein invited the band to write a song for the soundtrack of the Mandela biography film Mandela: Long Walk to Freedom, they responded with a quick "yes" according to Weinstein. After seeing early cuts of the film, the group were inspired to write a song reflecting upon Mandela. The song was mixed at Electric Lady Studios, New York City.

Release and reception
It was revealed on 17 October 2013, the band had written a song specifically for the film Mandela: Long Walk to Freedom entitled "Ordinary Love", after receiving an invitation from movie producer Harvey Weinstein. Subscribers of the band's official website were able to hear it first on the same day. It was reported that the song was to get a full preview on U2.com on 30 October but instead a news bulletin was released stating the song was to be released on a 10-inch vinyl. On 21 November 2013, U2 made the previously announced lyric video available for paying subscribers via their official website. The video was directed by Mac Premo and Oliver Jeffers. On 30 November, the song was made available as a free download on the band's website to paid subscribers.

"Ordinary Love" was released on 29 November 2013 as part of the Record Store Day's "Back to Black Friday". As a limited release, only 10,000 10" vinyl copies were made. During the recording of No Line on the Horizon, U2 worked on two sets of lyrics for "Breathe". The first version was about Nelson Mandela, and the second was "more surreal and personal". Whereas the second version was included on No Line on the Horizon, they decided to include the first version about Mandela on the vinyl as a B-side for "Ordinary Love", entitling it "Breathe (Mandela version)". Weinstein has said that he believes U2 have done a "brilliant job honouring the man".
Rolling Stone said, "'Ordinary Love' is about the seeds of dreams, and U2 play it perfectly: down-to-earth, while looking up." As of March 2014, the single has sold 115,000 copies in the United States.

U2 posted a new mix of the song, "Ordinary Love (Paul Epworth mix)", on their official SoundCloud account on 14 December 2013.

The song was performed by U2 with in-house band The Roots on The Tonight Show Starring Jimmy Fallon on 17 February 2014.

Awards

Cover art
The cover art for the "Ordinary Love" single features a "striking painting of Nelson Mandela" by Oliver Jeffers.

Personnel

U2
Bono – lead vocals
The Edge – guitar, backing vocals, piano
Adam Clayton – bass guitar
Larry Mullen Jr. – drums, percussion, backing vocals

Additional performers
Danger Mouse – additional synthesisers and piano
Declan Gaffney – additional synthesisers and piano
Barry Gorey – Wurlitzer, synthesiser
Angel Deradoorian – additional backing vocals

Technical
Danger Mouse – production, mixing
Declan Gaffney – additional production, recording
Tom Elhmhirst – mixing
Ben Baptie – mixing assistance, additional recording
"Classy" Joe Visciano – recording assistance
Grant Ransom – additional recording
Barry Gorey – additional recording
Scott Sedillo – mastering
Bernie Grundman – mastering

Chart performance

Weekly charts

Year-end charts

Certifications

See also

 Timeline of U2

References

External links
Ordinary Love at U2.com

2013 singles
Songs written by Bono
Songs written by Adam Clayton
Songs written by the Edge
Songs written by Larry Mullen Jr.
Songs written for films
Song recordings produced by Danger Mouse (musician)
Interscope Records singles
U2 songs
2013 songs
Number-one singles in Italy
Best Original Song Golden Globe winning songs
Songs about Nelson Mandela
Record Store Day releases